Unity College is a coeducational ecumenical college located in the Bellvista Estate in Caloundra West, a suburb of the Sunshine Coast Region in Queensland, Australia. The college is administered by Brisbane Catholic Education, working in partnership with the Caloundra Catholic and Uniting Churches.

Unity college has a total enrolment of more than 1400 students from Prep to Year 12, with an official count of 1422 students in 2017. Most students who attend Unity College are from the local Caloundra area, whereas others are from the Beerwah, Mooloolah Valley and Glenview areas. Approximately 50% of the school's students identify as Catholic and 16% are of the Uniting tradition, whereas the remaining 34% are of other faith backgrounds.

Houses

Unity College includes the following four houses with their respective colours, elements and significance:

Facilities

Facilities at Unity College include a chapel, an auditorium, and a Learning Resource Centre. There are 21 Junior Phase classrooms (three classes for each year level), and a Junior Phase Music building. For middle phase students there is a Middle Years Technology Centre (MYTC), which includes Science, Visual Art, Food Technology and Industrial Technology classrooms.

There is a 171-seat lecture theatre, two undercover multipurpose areas (Clachain Centre and Mo Chuisle Centre, two sports fields, and two basketball courts.

Co-curricular activities

Faith and Formation

 ANZAC Day March
 Caritas Australia Project Compassion & Carita's Ks
 Rosie's Charity
 St Vinnie's Sleepover
 Student Leadership
 Youth Group

Wellbeing

 Art Unite
 Bee Club
 College Musical
 Gaming Club
 Instrumental Music Program
 NARA Indigenous Group
 Sports clubs and activities

Teaching and learning

 Debating
 Japanese Exchange
 Japanese Speech Contest
 Mathematics competitions
 Mooting

Sports

 Rugby League Program
 Touch Football

Clubs and associations

 Little Gem's Playgroup, an activity of the Caloundra Uniting Church in co-operation with Unity College
 Parents & Friends
 Unity Bellvista Netball Club, established in 2012, is an associated club of the Caloundra District Netball Association
 Unity College Soccer Club, established in 2011, is a non-profit school-based soccer club in the Sunshine Coast Churches Soccer Association

References

External links
 Unity College Official Website

Catholic primary schools in Queensland
Schools on the Sunshine Coast, Queensland
Educational institutions established in 2006
2006 establishments in Australia
Catholic secondary schools in Queensland
Uniting Church schools in Australia